Undercover Customs is a television series produced by Granada Television for ITV which consisted of dramatic reconstructions of some of the largest real-life smuggling incidents based on the official records of HM Customs and Excise in the United Kingdom.The show ran for two series and consisted of 12 episodes in total. The series ran from July 1997 to September 1999. 

The series was presented by Sir Trevor McDonald and was supplemented by genuine surveillance footage and exclusive interviews with the Customs Officers responsible for the investigations of the organised smuggling rings, and also the witnesses and informants who helped crack each case. 
The 1998 series was Series Produced by Mike Kleinsteuber who also directed two of the programmes.

Episodes
The episodes and original air dates are as follows:
Undercover Customs (01/03/1999)
Operation Crux (21/05/1998)
Operation Barbecue (14/05/1998)
Operation Escape (07/05/1998)
Operation Fluke (30/04/1998)
Operation Oltet (23/04/1998)
Operation Bypass (16/04/1998)
Operation Klondyke (14/08/1997)
Operation Carla II (07/08/1997)
Operation Suntempest (31/07/1997)
Operation Babysitter (24/07/1997)
Operation Green Ice (17/07/1997)
Operation Begonia (10/07/1997)

ITV (TV network) original programming
1997 British television series debuts
1999 British television series endings